Malinovitsa is a rural locality (a village) in Kichmegnskoye Rural Settlement, Kichmengsko-Gorodetsky District, Vologda Oblast, Russia. The population was 56 as of 2002. There are 2 streets.

Geography 
Malinovitsa is located 22 km southeast of Kichmengsky Gorodok (the district's administrative centre) by road. Bolshoye Barakovo is the nearest rural locality.

References 

Rural localities in Kichmengsko-Gorodetsky District